The Gigaton Tour is a concert tour by the American rock band Pearl Jam. It is the band's first tour since 2018.

The tour was originally scheduled to consist of seventeen shows in North America, and fourteen shows in Europe during 2020. However, on March 9, 2020, the band announced that the first leg of North American shows would be postponed due to the COVID-19 pandemic, with the aim to reschedule them for a later date. On April 10, 2020, Pearl Jam announced that the European leg had been postponed until June/July 2021, also due to the COVID-19 pandemic. On July 23, 2020, Pearl Jam announced rescheduled dates for the European leg in the Summer of 2021. On October 5, 2020, two dates at BST Hyde Park in London, England were also announced. However, on March 30, 2021, the band confirmed that the planned shows for 2021 had been pushed back to 2022 due to the pandemic. On November 16, 2021, the band posted an announcement on their website stating that North American tour would start in May 2022.

Tour

Original 2020 plans
The North American leg of the tour was going to coincide with the release of the band's eleventh studio album, Gigaton. The first show would have taken place in Toronto, with the leg concluding with two shows in Oakland. Prior to the first show in the United States, the band were due to play at the Apollo Theater in New York City. It would have been an invitation-only show, for Sirius XM listeners and subscribers to Pandora.

Pixies, IDLES and White Reaper were announced as supporting the band across the dates in Europe 2020. The 2020 European leg was also scheduled to include several indoor shows, as well as outdoor festival shows at Rock Werchter, Lollapalooza in Stockholm and Paris, and the BST Hyde Park concert in London. The show at the Royal Arena in Copenhagen would have been on the eve of the 20th anniversary of the Roskilde tragedy. However, on April 8, 2020, the show in London was cancelled due to the coronavirus pandemic.

Leg 1, North America
The rescheduled tour started on May 3, 2022, at the Viejas Arena in San Diego, with the band paying tribute to Taylor Hawkins, who had died in March 2022. Four nights later, at Pearl Jam's second show at the Kia Forum in Inglewood, California, drummer Matt Cameron led the band with a cover of the Foo Fighters' song "Cold Day in the Sun", which featured Hawkins on vocals. However, Cameron would miss the next few shows after he tested positive for COVID-19, the first shows he had missed since joining the band in 1998. For the two shows at the Oakland Arena, Richard Stuverud and Josh Klinghoffer played the drums each night in Cameron's absence. On May 16, 2022 in Fresno, Stuverud and Klinghoffer continued to fill in for Cameron, along with the band's original drummer Dave Krusen. Krusen played on the songs from Ten during the night, the first time he had played multiple songs with the band since he left in 1991. The final two shows of the Spring tour, in Sacramento and Las Vegas, were both cancelled after bassist Jeff Ament also tested positive for COVID-19.

Leg 2, Europe
The European leg of the tour started on June 18, 2022, with Pearl Jam headlining the Pinkpop Festival in the Netherlands. The tour continued, including shows in Berlin, Zürich and Werchter. In between playing the Lollapalooza festival in Sweden and France, Pearl Jam also played two back-to-back shows at BST Hyde Park in London, England. The band were scheduled to play at the Wiener Stadthalle in Vienna on July 20, 2022. However, lead singer Eddie Vedder damaged his throat from the impact of playing outdoors in Paris, due to the heat, dust and the smoke from nearby wildfires, with the show being cancelled. The following show at the O2 Arena in Prague was also cancelled for the same reason. The final shows of the European tour were scheduled to be two nights at the Ziggo Dome in Amsterdam. The first show was cancelled due to Vedder's voice problems, but the second night went ahead as scheduled. The final show started with acoustic songs. Later in the set, Stone Gossard sang lead vocals on "Mankind", Matt Cameron sang on a cover of "Black Diamond" by Kiss, and Josh Klinghoffer sang on a cover of Prince's "Purple Rain".

Tour dates

Rescheduled shows
The European dates were originally announced in July 2020, with a revised set of dates announced in March 2021, and a further update for the two Amsterdam shows announced in November 2021. In March 2022, the band announced new and rescheduled dates for May and September 2022. However, due to planned renovations at Royal Farms Arena, the band's previously announced Baltimore show was cancelled.

Postponed shows

Cancelled shows

Band members
Pearl Jam
Jeff Ament – bass guitar
Stone Gossard – rhythm guitar
Mike McCready – lead guitar
Eddie Vedder – lead vocals, guitar
Matt Cameron – drums

Additional musicians
Boom Gaspar – Hammond B3 and keyboards
Josh Klinghoffer – drums, guitar, keyboards, percussion, backing vocals
Richard Stuverud – drums
Dave Krusen – drums (Fresno concert)

References

2022 concert tours
Pearl Jam concert tours
Concert tours postponed due to the COVID-19 pandemic